Patrick Field (born 6 June 1937) is a Hong Kong former middle-distance runner. He competed in the men's 800 metres at the 1964 Summer Olympics.

References

External links
 

1937 births
Living people
Athletes (track and field) at the 1964 Summer Olympics
Hong Kong male middle-distance runners
Olympic athletes of Hong Kong
Athletes (track and field) at the 1962 British Empire and Commonwealth Games
Commonwealth Games competitors for Hong Kong
Place of birth missing (living people)